Macrodontia batesi is a species of long-horned beetle. This species is among the largest beetles, and specimens have been known to exceed  in length. A fair bit of this length, however, is due to the enormous mandibles.

Distribution 
This species is known from the rain forests of Guatemala, Honduras, and Panama. Unconfirmed reports of beetles in the genus Macrodontia have also been recorded in southern Mexico.

Additional described species in the genus extend the overall range of the genus from Guatemala to Argentina.

External links 
 https://www.biolib.cz/en/taxon/id222693/

Prioninae
Beetles of North America
Beetles described in 1912
Taxa named by Auguste Lameere